

Peerage of England

|Duke of Cornwall (1337)||Edward of Westminster||1453||1471||
|-
|rowspan="2"|Duke of York (1385)||Richard of York, 3rd Duke of York||1426||1460||
|-
|Edward Plantagenet, 4th Duke of York||1460||1461||Proclaimed King, and all his honours merged in the Crown
|-
|rowspan="2"|Duke of Norfolk (1397)||John de Mowbray, 3rd Duke of Norfolk||1432||1461||Died
|-
|John de Mowbray, 4th Duke of Norfolk||1461||1476||
|-
|Duke of Exeter (1443)||Henry Holland, 3rd Duke of Exeter||1447||1461||Attainted, and his honours became forfeited
|-
|rowspan="2"|Duke of Buckingham (1444)||Humphrey Stafford, 1st Duke of Buckingham||1444||1460||
|-
|Henry Stafford, 2nd Duke of Buckingham||1460||1483||
|-
|rowspan="2"|Duke of Somerset (1448)||Henry Beaufort, 2nd Duke of Somerset||1455||1464||Attainted in 1461; restored in 1463; Died
|-
|Edmund Beaufort, 3rd Duke of Somerset||1464||1471||
|-
|Duke of Suffolk (1448)||John de la Pole, 2nd Duke of Suffolk||1450||1491||Title recognized in 1463
|-
|Duke of Clarence (1461)||George Plantagenet, 1st Duke of Clarence||1461||1478||New creation
|-
|Duke of Gloucester (1461)||Richard Plantagenet, 1st Duke of Gloucester||1461||1483||New creation
|-
|Earl of Warwick (1088)||Anne Neville, 16th Countess of Warwick and Richard Neville, 16th Earl of Warwick||14481449||14921471||
|-
|Earl of Arundel (1138)||William FitzAlan, 16th Earl of Arundel||1438||1487||
|-
|rowspan="2"|Earl of Oxford (1142)||John de Vere, 12th Earl of Oxford||1417||1462||Died
|-
|John de Vere, 13th Earl of Oxford||1462||1474||
|-
|rowspan="2"|Earl of Devon (1335)||Thomas Courtenay, 6th Earl of Devon||1458||1461||Attainted, and his honours became forfeited
|-
|none||1461||1470||Attainted
|-
|rowspan="2"|Earl of Salisbury (1337)||Alice Montacute, 5th Countess of Salisbury and Richard Neville, 5th Earl of Salisbury||14281442||14621460||Died
|-
|Richard Neville, 6th Earl of Salisbury||1462||1471||
|-
|Earl of Westmorland (1397)||Ralph Neville, 2nd Earl of Westmorland||1425||1484||
|-
|rowspan="2"|Earl of Northumberland (1416)||Henry Percy, 3rd Earl of Northumberland||1455||1461||Attainted, and his honours became forfeited
|-
|none||1461||1470||Attainted
|-
|rowspan="2"|Earl of Shrewsbury (1442)||John Talbot, 2nd Earl of Shrewsbury||1453||1460||Died
|-
|John Talbot, 3rd Earl of Shrewsbury||1460||1473||
|-
|Earl of Kendal (1446)||John de Foix, 1st Earl of Kendal||1446||1462||Surrendered the peerage
|-
|Earl of Wiltshire (1449)||James Butler, 1st Earl of Wiltshire||1449||1461||Died, title extinct
|-
|Earl of Worcester (1449)||John Tiptoft, 1st Earl of Worcester||1449||1470||
|-
|Earl of Surrey (1451)||John de Mowbray, 1st Earl of Surrey||1451||1476||Succeeded as the 4th Duke of Norfolk in 1461, see above
|-
|Earl of Richmond (1452)||Henry Tudor, Earl of Richmond||1456||1485||(Attainted in 1461)
|-
|Earl of Pembroke (1452)||Jasper Tudor, 1st Earl of Pembroke||1452||1461||Attainted
|-
|Earl of Essex (1461)||Henry Bourchier, 1st Earl of Essex||1461||1483||New creation
|-
|Earl of Kent (1461)||William Neville, 1st Earl of Kent||1461||1463||New creation; died, title extinct
|-
|Earl of Kent (1465)||Edmund Grey, 1st Earl of Kent||1465||1490||New creation
|-
|rowspan="2"|Earl Rivers (1465)||Richard Woodville, 1st Earl Rivers||1466||1469||New creation; died
|-
|Anthony Woodville, 2nd Earl Rivers||1469||1483||
|-
|Earl of Lincoln (1467)||John de la Pole, 1st Earl of Lincoln||1467||1487||New creation
|-
|Earl of Northumberland (1465)||John Neville, 1st Earl of Northumberland||1465||1469||New creation; cancelled in chancery
|-
|rowspan="2"|Earl of Pembroke (1469)||William Herbert, 1st Earl of Pembroke||1469||1469||New creation; created Baron Herbert in 1461; died
|-
|William Herbert, 2nd Earl of Pembroke||1469||1479||
|-
|Earl of Devon (1469)||Humphrey Stafford, 1st Earl of Devon||1469||1469||New creation; forfeited
|-
|rowspan="2"|Viscount Beaumont (1440)||John Beaumont, 1st Viscount Beaumont||1440||1460||Died
|-
|William Beaumont, 2nd Viscount Beaumont||1460||1507||Attainted 1461-1470
|-
|Viscount Bourchier (1446)||Henry Bourchier, 1st Viscount Bourchier||1446||1483||Created Earl of Essex, see above
|-
|Viscount Lisle (1451)||Thomas Talbot, 2nd Viscount Lisle||1453||1470||
|-
|rowspan="2"|Baron de Ros (1264)||Thomas de Ros, 9th Baron de Ros||1421||1464||Attainted in 1461; Died
|-
|Edmund de Ros, 10th Baron de Ros||1464||1508||Under attainder until 1485
|-
|Baron Dynham (1295)||John Dynham, 8th or 1st Baron Dynham||1467||1501||
|-
|Baron Fauconberg (1295)||Joan Neville, 6th Baroness Fauconberg||1429||1490||
|-
|Baron FitzWalter (1295)||Elizabeth Radcliffe, suo jure Baroness FitzWalter||1431||1485||
|-
|Baron FitzWarine (1295)||Thomazine FitzWarine, suo jure Baroness FitzWarine||1433||1471||
|-
|Baron Grey de Wilton (1295)||Reginald Grey, 7th Baron Grey de Wilton||1442||1493||
|-
|rowspan="2"|Baron Clinton (1299)||John de Clinton, 5th Baron Clinton||1431||1464||Died
|-
|John Clinton, 6th Baron Clinton||1464||1488||
|-
|Baron De La Warr (1299)||Richard West, 7th Baron De La Warr||1450||1476||
|-
|rowspan="2"|Baron Ferrers of Chartley (1299)||Anne Ferrers, 8th Baroness Ferrers of Chartley||1450||1468||Died
|-
|John Devereux, 9th Baron Ferrers of Chartley||1468||1501||
|-
|rowspan="2"|Baron Lovel (1299)||John Lovel, 8th Baron Lovel||1455||1465||Died
|-
|Francis Lovel, 9th Baron Lovel||1465||1485||
|-
|rowspan="2"|Baron Scales (1299)||Thomas de Scales, 7th Baron Scales||1419||1460||Died
|-
|Elizabeth de Scales Woodville, Baroness Scales||1460||1473||
|-
|rowspan="2"|Baron Welles (1299)||Lionel de Welles, 6th Baron Welles||1421||1461||Died, attainted and his honours were forfeited
|-
|Richard de Welles, 7th Baron Welles||1468||1469||Died, attainted and his honours were forfeited
|-
|Baron de Clifford (1299)||John Clifford, 9th Baron de Clifford||1455||1461||Died, attainted and his honours were forfeited
|-
|Baron Ferrers of Groby (1299)||Elizabeth Ferrers, 6th Baroness Ferrers of Groby||1445||1483||
|-
|Baron Morley (1299)||Alianore Lovel, 7th Baroness Morley||1442||1476||
|-
|Baron Strange of Knockyn (1299)||John le Strange, 8th Baron Strange||1449||1470||
|-
|rowspan="3"|Baron Zouche of Haryngworth (1308)||William la Zouche, 5th Baron Zouche||1415||1463||Died
|-
|William la Zouche, 6th Baron Zouche||1463||1468||Died
|-
|John la Zouche, 7th Baron Zouche||1468||1526||
|-
|Baron Audley of Heleigh (1313)||John Tuchet, 6th Baron Audley||1459||1490||
|-
|rowspan="2"|Baron Cobham of Kent (1313)||Edward Brooke, 6th Baron Cobham||1442||1464||Died
|-
|John Brooke, 7th Baron Cobham||1464||1512||
|-
|rowspan="2"|Baron Willoughby de Eresby (1313)||Joan Willoughby, 7th Baroness Willoughby de Eresby||1452||1462||Died
|-
|Robert Welles, 8th Baron Willoughby de Eresby||1462||1470||
|-
|Baron Dacre (1321)||Joan Dacre, 7th Baroness Dacre||1458||1486||
|-
|Baron FitzHugh (1321)||Henry FitzHugh, 5th Baron FitzHugh||1452||1472||
|-
|Baron Greystock (1321)||Ralph de Greystock, 5th Baron Greystock||1436||1487||
|-
|Baron Grey of Ruthyn (1325)||Edmund Grey, 4th Baron Grey de Ruthyn||1441||1490||Created Earl of Kent, see above
|-
|rowspan="2"|Baron Harington (1326)||William Bonville, 6th Baron Harington||1458||1460||Died
|-
|Cecily Bonville, 7th Baroness Harington||1460||1530||
|-
|Baron Poynings (1337)||Eleanor Percy, 6th Baroness Poynings||1446||1482||
|-
|Baron Scrope of Masham (1350)||Thomas Scrope, 5th Baron Scrope of Masham||1455||1475||
|-
|rowspan="2"|Baron Botreaux (1368)||William de Botreaux, 3rd Baron Botreaux||1392||1462||Died
|-
|Margaret Hungerford, 4th Baroness Botreaux||1462||1477||
|-
|Baron Scrope of Bolton (1371)||John Scrope, 5th Baron Scrope of Bolton||1459||1498||
|-
|Baron Lumley (1384)||Thomas Lumley, 2nd Baron Lumley||1461||1480||Restored
|-
|Baron Bergavenny (1392)||George Neville, 4th Baron Bergavenny||1447||1492||
|-
|Baron Grey of Codnor (1397)||Henry Grey, 4th Baron Grey of Codnor||1444||1496||
|-
|rowspan="2"|Baron Berkeley (1421)||James Berkeley, 1st Baron Berkeley||1421||1463||Died
|-
|William de Berkeley, 2nd Baron Berkeley||1463||1492||
|-
|Baron Hungerford (1426)||Robert Hungerford, 3rd Baron Hungerford||1459||1461||Attainted
|-
|rowspan="2"|Baron Latimer (1432)||George Neville, 1st Baron Latimer||1432||1469||Died
|-
|Richard Neville, 2nd Baron Latimer||1469||1530||
|-
|Baron Dudley (1440)||John Sutton, 1st Baron Dudley||1440||1487||
|-
|Baron Sudeley (1441)||Ralph Boteler, 1st Baron Sudeley||1441||1473||
|-
|Baron Saye and Sele (1447)||William Fiennes, 2nd Baron Saye and Sele||1450||1471||
|-
|Baron Beauchamp of Powick (1447)||John Beauchamp, 1st Baron Beauchamp of Powick||1447||1475||
|-
|Baron Rivers (1448)||Richard Woodville, 1st Baron Rivers||1448||1469||Created Earl Rivers in 1466, title held by his heirs until 1491, when it became extinct
|-
|rowspan="2"|Baron Stourton (1448)||John Stourton, 1st Baron Stourton||1448||1462||Died
|-
|William Stourton, 2nd Baron Stourton||1462||1479||
|-
|Baron Vessy (1449)||Henry Bromflete, 1st Baron Vessy||1449||1469||Died, Barony became extinct
|-
|Baron Bonville (1449)||William Bonville, 1st Baron Bonville||1449||1461||Died, title succeeded by the more senior Baroness Harington, and held by her heirs until 1554, when it was forfeited
|-
|Baron Egremont (1449)||Thomas Percy, 1st Baron Egremont||1449||1460||Died, title extinct
|-
|Baron Bergavenny (1450)||Edward Nevill, 1st Baron Bergavenny||1450||1476||
|-
|Baron Richemount (1450)||Thomas Grey, 1st Baron Richemount||1450||1461||Attainted, and his honours were forfeited
|-
|Baron Berners (1455)||John Bourchier, 1st Baron Berners||1455||1474||
|-
|Baron Stanley (1456)||Thomas Stanley, 2nd Baron Stanley||1459||1504||
|-
|Baron Dacre of Gilsland (1459)||Randolph Dacre, 1st Baron Dacre||1459||1461||Died, title extinct
|-
|Baron Neville (1459)||John Neville, Baron Neville||1459||1461||Died, attainted and title forfeited
|-
|Baron Montagu (1461)||John Neville, 1st Baron Montagu||1461||1471||New creation
|-
|Baron Cromwell (1461)||Humphrey Bourchier, 1st Baron Cromwell||1461||1471||New creation
|-
|Baron Hastings de Hastings (1461)||William Hastings, 1st Baron Hastings||1461||1483||New creation
|-
|rowspan="2"|Baron Ogle (1461)||Robert Ogle, 1st Baron Ogle||1461||1469||New creation, died
|-
|Owen Ogle, 2nd Baron Ogle||1469||1485||
|-
|Baron Wenlock (1461)||John Wenlock, 1st Baron Wenlock||1461||1471||New creation
|-
|Baron Mountjoy (1465)||Walter Blount, 1st Baron Mountjoy||1465||1474||New creation
|-
|}

Peerage of Scotland

|Duke of Rothesay (1398)||James Stewart, Duke of Rothesay||1452||1460||Acceeded to the Throne of Scotland
|-
|Duke of Albany (1456)||Alexander Stewart, Duke of Albany||1456||1483||
|-
|Earl of Ross (1215)||John of Islay, Earl of Ross||1449||1476||
|-
|rowspan=2|Earl of Sutherland (1235)||John de Moravia, 7th Earl of Sutherland||1427||1460||Died
|-
|John de Moravia, 8th Earl of Sutherland||1460||1508||
|-
|Earl of Orkney (1379)||William Sinclair, Earl of Orkney||1410||1476||
|-
|rowspan=2|Earl of Angus (1389)||George Douglas, 4th Earl of Angus||1446||1463||Died
|-
|Archibald Douglas, 5th Earl of Angus||1463||1513||
|-
|Earl of Crawford (1398)||David Lindsay, 5th Earl of Crawford||1453||1495||
|-
|Earl of Menteith (1427)||Malise Graham, 1st Earl of Menteith||1427||1490||
|-
|Earl of Huntly (1445)||Alexander Gordon, 1st Earl of Huntly||1445||1470||
|-
|rowspan=2|Earl of Erroll (1452)||William Hay, 1st Earl of Erroll||1452||1462||Died
|-
|Nicholas Hay, 2nd Earl of Erroll||1462||1470||
|-
|Earl of Caithness (1455)||William Sinclair, 1st Earl of Caithness||1455||1476||
|-
|Earl of Argyll (1457)||Colin Campbell, 1st Earl of Argyll||1457||1493||
|-
|Earl of Atholl (1457)||John Stewart, 1st Earl of Atholl||1457||1512||
|-
|Earl of Morton (1458)||James Douglas, 1st Earl of Morton||1458||1493||
|-
|Earl of Rothes (1458)||George Leslie, 1st Earl of Rothes||1458||1490||
|-
|rowspan=2|Earl Marischal (1458)||William Keith, 1st Earl Marischal||1458||1463||Died
|-
|William Keith, 2nd Earl Marischal||1463||1483||
|-
|Earl of Mar and Garioch (1459)||John Stewart, Earl of Mar and Garioch||1459||1479||
|-
|Earl of Arran (1467)||Thomas Boyd, Earl of Arran||1467||1469||New creation; attainted
|-
|Earl of Buchan (1469)||James Stewart, 1st Earl of Buchan||1469||1499||New creation
|-
|Lord Erskine (1429)||Thomas Erskine, 2nd Lord Erskine||1453||1494||de jure Earl of Mar
|-
|Lord Somerville (1430)||John Somerville, 3rd Lord Somerville||1456||1491||
|-
|rowspan=2|Lord Lorne (1439)||John Stewart, 2nd Lord of Lorne||1449||1463||Died
|-
|William Stewart, 3rd Lord of Lorne||1463||1469||Resigned the lordship to his nephew-in-law, the 1st Earl of Argyll
|-
|Lord Haliburton of Dirleton (1441)||George Haliburton, 4th Lord Haliburton of Dirleton||1459||1492||
|-
|rowspan=2|Lord Forbes (1442)||James Forbes, 2nd Lord Forbes||1448||1462||Died
|-
|William Forbes, 3rd Lord Forbes||1462||1483||
|-
|Lord Crichton (1443)||William Crichton, 3rd Lord Crichton||1454||1484||
|-
|Lord Hamilton (1445)||James Hamilton, 1st Lord Hamilton||1445||1479||
|-
|Lord Maxwell (1445)||Robert Maxwell, 2nd Lord Maxwell||1454||1485||
|-
|Lord Glamis (1445)||Alexander Lyon, 2nd Lord Glamis||1459||1486||
|-
|rowspan=2|Lord Graham (1445)||Patrick Graham, 1st Lord Graham||1445||1466||Died
|-
|William Graham, 2nd Lord Graham||1466||1472||
|-
|Lord Lindsay of the Byres (1445)||John Lindsay, 1st Lord Lindsay||1445||1482||
|-
|rowspan=2|Lord Saltoun (1445)||Lawrence Abernethy, 1st Lord Saltoun||1445||1460||Died
|-
|William Abernethy, 2nd Lord Saltoun||1460||1488||
|-
|rowspan=2|Lord Gray (1445)||Andrew Gray, 1st Lord Gray||1445||1469||Died
|-
|Andrew Gray, 2nd Lord Gray||1469||1514||
|-
|Lord Montgomerie (1449)||Alexander Montgomerie, 1st Lord Montgomerie||1449||1470||
|-
|Lord Fleming (1451)||Robert Fleming, 1st Lord Fleming||1451||1494||
|-
|Lord Seton (1451)||George Seton, 1st Lord Seton||1451||1478||
|-
|Lord Borthwick (1452)||William Borthwick, 1st Lord Borthwick||1452||1470||
|-
|Lord Boyd (1454)||Robert Boyd, 1st Lord Boyd||1454||1482||
|-
|Lord Oliphant (1455)||Laurence Oliphant, 1st Lord Oliphant||1455||1498||New creation
|-
|Lord Kennedy (1457)||Gilbert Kennedy, 1st Lord Kennedy||1457||1489||
|-
|rowspan=2|Lord Livingston (1458)||James Livingston, 1st Lord Livingston||1458||1467||Died
|-
|James Livingston, 2nd Lord Livingston||1467||1497||
|-
|Lord Hailes (1458)||Patrick Hepburn, 1st Lord Hailes||1458||1483||
|-
|Lord Avandale (1459)||Andrew Stewart, 1st Lord Avandale||1459||1488||
|-
|Lord Cathcart (1460)||Alan Cathcart, 1st Lord Cathcart||1460||1497||New creation
|-
|Lord Darnley (1460)||John Stewart, 1st Baron Darnley||1460||1495||New creation
|-
|Lord Lovat (1464)||Hugh Fraser, 1st Lord Lovat||1464||1500||New creation
|-
|}

Peerage of Ireland

|rowspan=2|Earl of Ulster (1264)||Richard of York, 8th Earl of Ulster||1425||1460||Died
|-
|Edward of York, 9th Earl of Ulster||1460||1461||Title merged in the Crown
|-
|Earl of Kildare (1316)||Thomas FitzGerald, 7th Earl of Kildare||1434||1478||
|-
|rowspan=2|Earl of Ormond (1328)||James Butler, 5th Earl of Ormond||1452||1461||Died
|-
|John Butler, 6th Earl of Ormond||1461||1478||
|-
|rowspan=3|Earl of Desmond (1329)||James FitzGerald, 6th Earl of Desmond||1420||1463||Died
|-
|Thomas FitzGerald, 7th Earl of Desmond||1463||1468||Died
|-
|James FitzGerald, 8th Earl of Desmond||1468||1487||
|-
|rowspan=2|Earl of Waterford (1446)||John Talbot, 2nd Earl of Waterford||1453||1460||Died
|-
|John Talbot, 3rd Earl of Waterford||1460||1473||
|-
|Baron Athenry (1172)||Thomas II de Bermingham||1428||1473||
|-
|rowspan=2|Baron Kingsale (1223)||Patrick de Courcy, 11th Baron Kingsale||1430||1460||Died
|-
|Nicholas de Courcy, 12th Baron Kingsale||1460||1476||
|-
|rowspan=2|Baron Kerry (1223)||Thomas Fitzmaurice, 8th Baron Kerry||1410||1469||Died
|-
|Edmond Fitzmaurice, 9th Baron Kerry||1469||1498||
|-
|Baron Barry (1261)||William Barry, 8th Baron Barry||1420||1480||
|-
|Baron Gormanston (1370)||Robert Preston, 4th Baron Gormanston||1450||1503||
|-
|rowspan=2|Baron Slane (1370)||David Fleming, 5th Baron Slane||1457||1463||Died
|-
|Thomas Fleming, 6th Baron Slane||1463||1470||
|-
|rowspan=2|Baron Howth (1425)||Christopher St Lawrence, 2nd Baron Howth||1430||1465||Died
|-
|Robert St Lawrence, 3rd Baron Howth||1465||1485||
|-
|rowspan=3|Baron Killeen (1449)||Christopher Plunkett, 2nd Baron Killeen||1455||1462||Died
|-
|Christopher Plunkett, 3rd Baron Killeen||1462||1469||Died
|-
|Edmond Plunkett, 4th Baron Killeen||1469||1510||
|-
|Baron Trimlestown (1461)||Robert Barnewall, 1st Baron Trimlestown||1461||1470||New creation
|-
|rowspan=2|Baron Dunsany (1462)||Christopher Plunkett, 1st Baron of Dunsany||1462||1463||New creation; died
|-
|Richard Plunkett, 2nd Baron of Dunsany||1463||1480||
|-
|Baron Portlester (1462)||Rowland FitzEustace, 1st Baron Portlester||1462||1496||New creation
|-
|Baron Ratoath (1468)||Robert Bold, 1st Baron Ratoath||1468||1479||New creation
|-
|}

References

 

Lists of peers by decade
1460s in England
1460s in Ireland
15th century in England
15th century in Scotland
15th century in Ireland
15th-century English nobility
15th-century Scottish peers
15th-century Irish people
Peers